The ZIS-151 was a general-purpose truck produced by the Soviet car manufacturer Automotive Factory No. 2 Zavod imeni Stalina in 1948–1958. In 1956, the factory was renamed to Zavod imeni Likhacheva, and new trucks were called ZIL-151.

The ZIS-151 was the first major Soviet military all-wheel-drive truck built following World War II, replacing the imported U.S. Studebaker US6 and the earlier Soviet ZIS-6. In early 1948, the cabs were made of wood, soon replaced with a steel cab.  Tens of thousands were produced, including specialized versions for hauling different types of cargo. The Soviets also found the trucks an ideal platform for BM-13 Katyusha rocket launchers.

The most famous developments of ZIS-151 were the BTR-152 armored personnel carrier and the BAV 485 amphibious vehicle. Due to de-Stalinization the ZIS-151 was renamed in 1956 to ZIL-151.

In 1958, an improved model, the ZIL-157, was introduced and replaced the ZIS-151. It differed outwardly by its grille and having single rear tires, instead of the ZIL-151's dual tires.

In 1956, the Chinese began building the ZIS-151 under license as the Jiefang CA-30 at First Automobile Works, with slightly more power and angular front fenders. The improved single tire CA-30, introduced in 1958, remained in production until 1986.

Engine and driveline 
The ZIS-151 engine, a  L-head inline 6 cylinder gasoline engine developing  at 2600 rpm.

The transmission was a 5 speed with a direct 4th gear and overdrive 5th. The transfer case had high and low ranges, and selectively engaged the front axle. Both front and rear axles were a split type.

Chassis 
The chassis was 6×6, with three live beam axles, adapted and strengthened for conditions in the USSR. It had a reinforced ladder frame with three live beam axles, the front on semi elliptical leaf springs, the rear tandem on quarter elliptical leaf springs with locating arms.

ZIS-151’s tires have a larger cross section,  versus the US6’s . Both had dual rear tires. The wider tires spread the load over a wider area. This allows the truck to be operated on softer surfaces.

The ZIL-157 has much wider  single rear tires. To further increase the footprint, a centralized inflation system allows the tire pressure to be reduced from the cab for soft surfaces, then re-inflated for road use.

The drive shafts were laid out like the US6, but as a mirror image, the front axle differential was offset to the left, while American trucks were offset to the right. Air brakes were used, on the ZIL-157 the air system also supplied the centralized inflation system.

Specifications 
6×6  ZIS-150 based truck
Engine: ZIS-121 6-cyl,  at 2600 rpm, 
Bore/stroke:  × 
Compression ratio: 6.0
Clutch: dry twin plate
Gearbox: 5×2 speeds
Length: 
Width: 
Height: 
Wheelbase: , rear axis clearance: 
Front wheel track: 
Rear track: 
Turning radius on front outer wheel: 
Weight (without load): 
Maximal speed (loaded, highway): 
Tyres: 
Fuel tank capacity: 2× 
Fuel consumption:

Variants
ZIS-151: Original production version. Produced 1947-1958.
ZIS-151D: As ZIS-151 except with shielded electrical equipment. Produced 1955-1958.
ZIS-151E: Export version of ZIS-151. Produced 1949-1958.
ZIS-151P: Cab-chassis version (for PMZM-3 fire truck). Produced 1951-1956.
ZIS-151U: Export version of ZIS-151 for tropical climates. Produced 1956-1958.
ZIS-121B: Tractor-trailer version. Produced 1954-1958.
ZIS-121D: As ZIS-121B, except powered by a ZIS-121D engine. Produced 1955-1958.
ZIS-151A (ZIS-121G): Prototype modernized version of ZIS-151. Produced in 1953; entered production as the ZIL-157.
ZIS-151B:
ZIS-151V (ZIL-157A):
ZIS-121V: Prototype for BTR-152.
ZIS-153: Prototype halftrack version. Produced in 1952.
ZIS-151G (ZIL-E157): Prototype for ZIL-157.
ZIS-128:
BTR-152: Armoured personnel carrier.
BAV 485: Amphibious military version.

References

External links

ZiL vehicles
Trucks of the Soviet Union
Military vehicles introduced from 1945 to 1949